West Virginia held elections on November 3, 2020. Elections for the United States Senate and House, as well as for several statewide offices including the governorship were held. These elections were held concurrently with the 2020 U.S. presidential election and other elections nationwide. The Democratic and Republican party primary elections were held on June 9, 2020.

Federal offices

President

Incumbent Republican Donald Trump easily carried West Virginia, capturing 68.62% of the vote. Trump captured every county in the state and it was his second-best showing behind Wyoming.

Senate
Incumbent Republican Senator Shelley Moore Capito was easily reelected. With a vote share of 70.3%, she was the first Republican Senator to win reelection in West Virginia since 1907.

House of Representatives
All 3 Incumbent Republican U.S. Representatives were easily reelected, all increasing their vote share compared to 2018.

Governor
Incumbent Republican Governor Jim Justice won reelection to a second term over Democrat Ben Salango with 64.8% of the vote. Justice increased his vote margin substantially compared with his first election in 2016, when he was the democratic candidate, receiving just 49.1% of the overall vote. This was the first time a Republican candidate carried every county in the state during a gubernatorial election.

State Legislature

State Senate

17 of the 34 seats in the West Virginia State Senate held elections, including 11 Republican-held seats and 6 Democratic-held seats. Four incumbents chose not to seek re-election due to retirement: Democrats Paul Hardesty, Roman Prezioso, and Corey Palumbo and Republican Kenny Mann. Republicans won 3 seats over Democratic candidates, increasing their majority in the chamber from 20 to 23 seats.

House of Delegates

All 100 seats in the West Virginia House of Delegates will have an election. Nineteen incumbents chose not to seek re-election: 11 Democrats and 8 Republicans. Republicans flipped 18 seats, increasing their majority in the chamber from 58 to 76 seats.

Attorney General
Republican incumbent Patrick Morrisey was re-elected with 51.63% of the vote in 2016 and successfully sought re-election.

Republican primary

Candidates
 Patrick Morrisey, incumbent Attorney General of West Virginia and nominee for U.S. Senate in 2018

Democratic primary

Candidates
 Sam Petsonk, attorney
 Isaac Sponaugle, state delegate

Polling

General election

Secretary of State
Republican incumbent Mac Warner was elected with 48.52% of the vote in 2016, and successfully sought re-election.

Republican primary

Candidates
 Mac Warner, incumbent Secretary of State of West Virginia

Withdrawn 
 Tyrin Smith-Holmes of Huntington

Democratic primary

Candidates
 Natalie Tennant, former Secretary of State, candidate for Governor of West Virginia in 2011, and nominee for U.S. Senate in 2014

Withdrawn 
 Brent Pauley, journalist at EnAct West Virginia

Polling

General election

Treasurer
Democratic incumbent John Perdue was re-elected with 50.33% of the vote in 2016, but lost re-election to Republican candidate Riley Moore.

Democratic primary

Candidates
 John Perdue, incumbent West Virginia State Treasurer and candidate for Governor of West Virginia in 2011

Republican primary

Candidates
 Riley Moore, former state delegate

Polling

General election

Auditor
Republican incumbent JB McCuskey was elected with 58.48% of the vote in 2016 and successfully sought re-election.

Republican primary

Candidates
 JB McCuskey, incumbent West Virginia State Auditor

Democratic primary

Candidates
 Mary Ann Claytor, accountant and auditor, nominee for West Virginia State Auditor in 2016, candidate for West Virginia State Senate in 2018, and former candidate for the West Virginia House of Delegates in 2020

General election

Commissioner of Agriculture
Republican incumbent Kent Leonhardt was elected with 48.41% of the vote in 2016 and successfully sought re-election.

Republican primary

Candidates
 Kent Leonhardt, incumbent West Virginia Commissioner of Agriculture
 Roy Ramey, farm owner and American Freedom nominee for West Virginia State Senate in 2014

Democratic primary

Candidates
 Bob Beach, state senator
 William Keplinger, farmer and businessman
 Dave Miller, farmer

Withdrawn 
 Patricia Bunner, attorney

General election

Supreme Court of Appeals

Division 1 
The incumbent was Tim Armstead, who was appointed to the court to replace Justice Menis Ketchum, who resigned from the court shortly before being convicted on a felony fraud charge. Armstead then won a 2018 special election to serve the remainder of Ketchum's term with 26.1% of the vote. He successfully won re-election to a full term.

Candidates 
 Tim Armstead, incumbent Justice and Chief Justice of the West Virginia Supreme Court of Appeals
 David Hummel Jr., circuit court judge on the Second West Virginia Circuit Court
 Richard Neely, former Chief Justice of the West Virginia Supreme Court of Appeals

Division 2
The incumbent Margaret Workman, did not seek re-election after controversies and the threat of possible impeachment. Bill Wooton, a former state senator, was elected with 31.0% of the vote.

Candidates 
 Jim Douglas, family court judge on the Eleventh West Virginia Circuit Court
 Kris Raynes, Putnam County assistant prosecuting attorney
 Joanna Tabit, circuit court judge on the Thirteenth West Virginia Circuit Court
 William R. Wooton, former state senator and candidate for the West Virginia Supreme Court of Appeals in 2016

Division 3
The incumbent was John A. Hutchison, who was appointed to the court to replace justice Allen Loughry, who resigned from the court in the midst of his impeachment trial. Hutchison successfully sought re-election to serve the remainder of Loughry's term.

Candidates 
 Lora Dyer, circuit court judge on the Fifth West Virginia Circuit Court
 John A. Hutchison, incumbent Justice and former circuit court judge
 William Schwartz, attorney

Notes

References

External links
 
 
  (State affiliate of the U.S. League of Women Voters)
 
 . (Guidance to help voters get to the polls; addresses transport, childcare, work, information challenges)
 

Official campaign websites for Attorney General
 Patrick Morrisey (R) for Attorney General 
 Sam Petsonk (D) for Attorney General 

Official campaign websites for Secretary of State
 Natalie Tennant (D) for Secretary of State
 Mac Warner (R) for Secretary of State

Official campaign websites for Treasurer
 Riley Moore (R) for Treasurer
 John Perdue (D) for Treasurer

Official campaign websites for Auditor
 Mary Ann Claytor (D) for Auditor 
 JB McCuskey (R) for Auditor

Official campaign websites for Commissioner of Agriculture
 Bob Beach (D) for Commissioner
 Kent Leonhardt (R) for Commissioner

 
West Virginia judicial elections
West Virginia